Yinka Ayefele MON is a Nigerian music producer, gospel singer, Music CDS, VCD's, He has Presented by API Music (Alloy Production International) 1998 - 2009, Galaxy Music (2008 - 2018), Role Model Entertainment (2019–Present) and radio presenter and founder of Fresh FM Radio Station, Ibadan.

Early life
Ayefele was born in Ipoti-Ekiti, a city in Ekiti State in southwestern Nigeria.

Education 
He attended Our Saviours Anglican Primary School in Ipoti-Ekiti for his primary and secondary education before he later proceeded to Ondo State College of Arts and Science in Ikare Akoko, Ondo State, Nigeria.

Career
Ayefele worked briefly as journalist and broadcaster at the Federal Radio Corporation of Nigeria, Ibadan, where he also produced jingles and musical works on radio. 
He began his music career in 1997 after he was involved in an automobile accident which damaged his spinal cord and made him reliant on a wheelchair. While in the hospital after spending there about 9 months, his friend, Kola Olootu visited and advised him to put some songs together. This suggestion resulted in the release of his debut album titled, Bitter Experience in 1998 which brought him into limelight. The release of Bitter Experience was followed by the release of Sweet Experience. Other albums released by the gospel musician are Something Else, Divine Intervention and Life after death, released in honor of Gbenga Adeboye, a Nigerian radio presenter, musician and comedian. The title Bitter Experience reflected his ordeal and Sweet Experience was the sweetness after a "Bitter Experience".

Awards and honours
He had received over 200 awards. Among other awards are:
Member of the Order of the Niger awarded by Goodluck Ebele Jonathan, the president of the Federal Republic of Nigeria (2011)
Ekiti cultural ambassador award

Radio station 
Yinka Ayefele owns a radio station called Fresh FM 105.9 FM located in Oyo state. The radio station was established in 2015 and licensed by NBC on 30 April 2015.

Ayefele's Music House, which also house a radio station Fresh FM and a studio, was on 19 August 2018 demolished by the Oyo State Government. The reason the government gave for the demolition was  that the property's location contravene the stipulations by the town planning authority. This sparked outrage from fans and sympathizers.

Discography
Bitter Experience (1998)
Sweet Experience (1999)
Something Else (2000)
Divine Intervention (2001)
Fun Fair (2002)
Life after Death (2003)
Aspiration (2003)
Fulfilment (2004)
New Dawn (2005)
Next Level (2006)
Gratitude (2007)
Absolute Praise (2008)
Transformation (2009)
Everlasting Grace (2010)
Prayer Point (2011)
Goodness Of God (2012)
Comforter (2013)
Overcomer (2014)
Upliftment (2015)
Fresh Glory (2016)
Living Testimony (2017)
Favour (2018)
Beyond The Limits (2019)         
Ekundayo  (Exhilaration) (2020)
Manifestation (2021)
So Far So Good (2022)

References

1968 births
Living people
Nigerian male musicians
Nigerian composers
People from Ekiti State
Yoruba musicians
Yoruba-language singers
Nigerian people with disabilities
Musicians from Ekiti State
Members of the Order of the Niger
Wheelchair users